Live at Third Man Records may refer to: 

Live at Third Man Records (Blitzen Trapper album), 2016 album by Blitzen Trapper
Live at Third Man Records (Billie Eilish album), 2020 album by Billie Eilish
Live at Third Man Records West, 2009 EP by The Dead Weather
Live at Third Man, 2011 EP by White Denim
Live at Third Man Records, 2010 album by the Dex Romweber Duo
Live at Third Man Records, 2010 album by The Raconteurs
Live at Third Man Records, 2010 album by Conan O'Brien
Live at Third Man Records, 2010 album by Nobunny
Live at Third Man Records, 2010 album by PUJOL
Live at Third Man Records, 2010 album by Jenny & Johnny
Live at Third Man Records, 2010 album by Tyvek
Live at Third Man Records, 2010 album by JEFF the Brotherhood
Live at Third Man Records, 2010 album by the Jacuzzi Boys
Live at Third Man Records, 2011 album by Reggie Watts
Live at Third Man Records, 2011 album by the Cold War Kids
Live at Third Man Records, 2011 album by Wanda Jackson
Live at Third Man Records, 2011 album by the Drive-By Truckers
Live at Third Man Records, 2011 album by Davilla 666
Live at Third Man Records, 2011 album by White Denim

For more see Third Man Records#Discography